Menegazzia pseudocyphellata is a species of lichen found in Taiwan. It was identified in 2003 in Taroko National Park on Hehuanshan at an elevation of 3,200 meters.

See also
 List of Menegazzia species

References 

pseudocyphellata
Lichen species
Lichens described in 2003
Lichens of Asia
Taxa named by André Aptroot